"Sweets for My Sweet" is a song written by the songwriting team of Doc Pomus and Mort Shuman, originally recorded by the Drifters.

The Drifters version
The group's first single featuring Charlie Thomas on lead vocal, "Sweets for My Sweet" reached  16 on the Billboard Hot 100 and No. 10 on the R&B chart, in October 1961.  This was one of the few post-1958 Drifters singles that did not feature a string section. The song has a strong piano and bongo-led Cuban-style cha-cha rhythm. It also featured Jimmy Radcliffe and four female backup vocalists, all of whom would later have hit records: Cissy Houston, Doris Troy, Dionne Warwick, and Dee Dee Warwick. The recording also features an up-in-front piano provided by co-writer Mort Shuman. Other musicians on the recording included George Barnes and Allan Hanlon on guitar, Abie Baker on bass, Ed Shaughnessy and Gary Chester on drums and Bobby Rosengarden and Ray Kessler on percussion.

The Searchers version

In 1963, "Sweets for My Sweet" was released by Merseybeat band the Searchers as their debut single, reaching No. 1 on the UK Single Chart for two weeks that August. The Searchers' version was also issued in the US in 1964 but failed to chart.

C. J. Lewis version

British reggae singer C. J. Lewis released his version of "Sweets for My Sweet" as his debut single in 1994. It reached No. 3 in the United Kingdom, the Netherlands, and New Zealand. The song was produced by Phillip Leo, who also produced Lewis' debut album, Dollars. The female vocals are performed by singer Samantha Depasois.

Critical reception
Pan-European magazine Music & Media noted that here, the Searchers 1963 classic "is completely reworked in a dead trendy ragga version, which is so cheerful that you can't believe storms and depression ever existed. Nobody will be surprised that it's heavily played on Bay Radio/St. Julian's on holiday island Malta." Alan Jones from Music Week wrote, "Yes, it is the old Searchers hit, and it sounds surprisingly good too considering it has been dragged uncompromisingly into the Nineties. Now an easy to swallow confection, part reggae, part jackswing, it slips down a treat." Pete Stanton from Smash Hits gave Lewis' version four out of five, adding, "Though CJ's a bit of a star in the reggae charts he has yet to set the proper charts alight — but Sweets should do that." He also remarked that the singer "has reggaed it up and turned it into a groovy, radio-friendly bopper."

Chart performance
In addition to reaching No. 3 on the UK Singles Chart, "Sweets for My Sweet" also had big success in New Zealand, peaking for two weeks at No. 3. After debuting at No. 6, it then spent a further 10 consecutive weeks inside the top 10. After dropping to No.11 the following week, it returned to No. 6. Six weeks later after fluctuating around the top 40, it returned for one final week in the top 10, at No. 10. At the end of 1994, the song was ranked No. 6 on New Zealand's year-end chart. "Sweets for My Sweet" was also a top-ten hit in Austria, Belgium, Iceland, Ireland, the Netherlands, and Switzerland. The track also charted in Australia and Germany.

Music video
The accompanying music video for "Sweets for My Sweet" was directed by Jerome Redfarne.

Track listings

Charts

Weekly charts

Year-end charts

Certifications

Other cover versions
 In 1965, the Buckinghams released it as a single.
 The McCoys released a version of the song on their 1966 album, You Make Me Feel So Good.
 "Sweets for My Sweet" was remade in 1966 by Don and the Goodtimes - a sunshine pop band led by Don Galucci formerly of the Kingsmen - and in 1967 by Chicago area garage band, the Riddles. 
 In 1968 Cashman Pistilli & West remade "Sweets for My Sweet" under the name Central Park West.
 In 1968 Yugoslav rock band Džentlmeni released a Serbo-Croatian version of the song entitled "Slatko" ("Sweet").
 "Sweets for My Sweet" was a 1969 single for the Sweet Inspirations serving as the title cut for their 1969 album cut at Muscle Shoals Sound Studio with Tom Dowd producing.
 In the UK, Tina Charles remade "Sweets for My Sweet" in 1977 in tandem with "Love Bug". The track was included on her album Rendezvous and issued as a single reaching No. 26; however the single edit only featured one chorus from "Sweets for My Sweet" at its close.
 In 1975, the British band Magnum released it as their first single.
 Frank Alamo helped popularise the yé-yé style of music in France. His hit records included "Biche ô ma Biche" ("Sweets for My Sweet")
 The only US remake of "Sweets for My Sweet" to reach the Hot 100 or any Billboard chart to date is that by Tony Orlando which reached No. 54  and No. 20 on the Hot Adult Contemporary chart in 1979.
 In 1986, Europop and Italo disco singer Chriss recorded the song for her album "Sweets for My Sweet."
 In 1988, Super Cat released his album "Sweets for My Sweet", including his remake of the song.
 "Sweets for My Sweet" was also recorded by the Carnival, Manolo Muñoz (as  "Dulces Para Mi Nena"), and Neil Diamond (on his 1993 "oldies" album Up on the Roof: Songs from the Brill Building.
 In 1995, Brian Wilson recorded "Sweets for My Sweet" on 'Til The Night Has Gone - A Tribute to Doc Pomus, as part of the Andy Paley sessions.
 In 2004, German pop group Preluders covered the song for their album Prelude to History.

References

1961 songs
1961 singles
The Drifters songs
1963 debut singles
The Searchers (band) songs
1994 debut singles
C. J. Lewis songs
Songs with music by Mort Shuman
Songs with lyrics by Doc Pomus
The McCoys songs
Tina Charles (singer) songs
Neil Diamond songs
Tony Orlando songs
Irish Singles Chart number-one singles
UK Singles Chart number-one singles
Atlantic Records singles
Pye Records singles